Agrothereutes abbreviatus is a species of parasitic wasp belonging to the family Ichneumonidae.

Description
Agrothereutes abbreviatus has black head and thorax, while the abdomen shows black and reddish bands, with a white area on the tip and a white basal zone on the hind tibia. In the females wings are very reduced (brachyptery), reaching only the hind margin of postscutellum or the first abdominal tergite. These wasps usually move nimbly on the ground and beneath the fallen leaves looking for their hosts. Adults occurs from May to June.

Distribution
This species is present in most of European countries, in the Near East, in the Nearctic realm, and in the Oriental realm.

Taxonomy

Subspecies
Sources:
 Agrothereutes abbreviatus abbreviatus (Fabricius, 1798)
 Agrothereutes abbreviatus alsaticus (Seyrig, 1927)
 Agrothereutes abbreviatus iridescens (Cresson, 1864)
 Agrothereutes abbreviatus rufopectus Cushman, 1927

Synonyms
 Agrothereutes alpius Heinrich, 1951
 Agrothereutes tricolor (Uchida, 1931)
 Agrothereutes alpinus (Habermehl, 1925)
 Agrothereutes cingulatus (Kiss, 1924)
 Agrothereutes variegatus (Kiss, 1924)
 Agrothereutes tricolor (Rudow, 1917)
 Agrothereutes atratus (Rudow, 1917)
 Agrothereutes spectabilis (Rudow, 1917)
 Agrothereutes livonensis (Rudow, 1917)
 Agrothereutes spectabilis (Rudow, 1914)
 Agrothereutes brevipennis (Kriechbaumer, 1893)
 Agrothereutes tricolor (Rudow, 1886)
 Agrothereutes spectabilis (Rudow, 1886)
 Agrothereutes destitutus Vollenhoven, 1879
 Agrothereutes dispar (Thomson, 1873)
 Agrothereutes batavus Vollenhoven, 1873
 Agrothereutes brevipennis (Marshall, 1867)
 Agrothereutes leucomerus (Ratzeburg, 1852)
 Agrothereutes evanescens (Ratzeburg, 1852)
 Agrothereutes ocellator (Zetterstedt, 1838)
 Agrothereutes incubitor (Gravenhorst, 1829)
 Agrothereutes tibiator (Gravenhorst, 1829)
 Agrothereutes marginellus (Gravenhorst, 1829)
 Agrothereutes hopei (Gravenhorst, 1829)
 Agrothereutes pygoleucus (Gravenhorst, 1829)
 Agrothereutes breviator (Thunberg, 1822)
 Agrothereutes abbreviator (Fabricius, 1798)

References

Cryptinae
Insects described in 1794
Taxa named by Johan Christian Fabricius